Nelson Setimani (born 5 February 1990) is a South African cricketer. He was included in the South Western Districts cricket team squad for the 2016 Africa T20 Cup. In September 2019, he was named in Eastern Province's squad for the 2019–20 CSA Provincial T20 Cup.

References

External links
 

1990 births
Living people
South African cricketers
Eastern Province cricketers
South Western Districts cricketers
Sportspeople from Qonce